Giovanni Francesco Grossi (12 February 1653 – 29 May 1697) was one of the greatest Italian castrato singers of the baroque age. He is better known as Siface.

Biography
He was born near Pescia in Tuscany, entered the papal chapel in 1675, and later sang at Venice. He derived his nickname of Siface from his impersonation of that character in Cavalli's opera, Scipione affricano. It has generally been said that he appeared as Siface in Alessandro Scarlatti's Mitridate, but the confusion is due to his having sung the part of Mitridate in Scarlatti's Pompeo at Naples in 1683.

In 1687, he was sent to London by the duke of Modena, to become a member of the chapel of James II. He probably did much for the introduction of Italian music into England, but soon left the country on account of the climate. He was murdered in 1697 on the road between Bologna and Ferrara, allegedly by the agents of a nobleman with whose wife he had a liaison, although later sources indicate that he was killed at the behest of the brothers of Elena Marsili, a widowed Countess, who Siface had an affair with when they were both at the court of the Duke of Modena.

Among Purcell's harpsichord music is an air entitled Sefauchi's Farewell, presumably written when Siface left England and returned to Italy.

References 

  This work in turn cites:
 Corrado Ricci, Vita Barocca (Milan, 1904).

1653 births
1697 deaths
Italian male singers
People from Pescia
Castrati